Ulpia (full name possibly Ulpia Plotina, about 31 - before 86) was a noble Spanish Roman woman from the gens Ulpia during the 1st century CE. She was the paternal aunt of Roman emperor Trajan and paternal grandmother of emperor Hadrian.

Life

Her paternal ancestors moved from Italy and settled in Italica (near modern Seville, Spain) in the Roman Province of Hispania Baetica in the late 3rd century BC. Her brother was Marcus Ulpius Traianus, who served as a distinguished Roman general and was the first person in her family to enter the Roman Senate. He was the biological father of Trajan, adopted son and heir of the deified emperor Nerva.

Ulpia married a Roman Senator, Publius Aelius Hadrianus Marullinus, a wealthy and aristocratic Hispanic Roman from the gens Aelia. Ulpia and Marullinus had at least one son, Publius Aelius Hadrianus Afer, who would become a distinct Roman soldier and politician. He married a noble Spanish Roman woman called Domitia Paulina and the couple had Aelia Domitia Paulina and Publius Aelius Hadrianus or Hadrian, who was adopted by Trajan and became his heir.

Identification
A very wealthy woman named Ulpia M. f. Plotina ("M. f." meaning her fathers praenomen was Marcus) that is attested from a triptych dated July 19, 69 AD from Herculaneum has been speculated by several historians to be Trajan's aunt and Hadrian's grandmother. This is mainly due to the her sharing her rare cognomen with Trajan's wife Pompeia Plotina, which by extension has also led to speculation that Trajan and empress Pompeia Plotina were related. The inscription describes this Ulpia Plotina being owed 15.000 denarii by a businessman named Lucius Cominius Primus. Based on another text Primus was also lending money to a woman named Pompeia Anthis who was in the custody of a man named Gaius Vibius Erytus. As with the Pompeii, the gens Vibia was associated with the imperial family trought Trajan, his grandniece being Vibia Sabina, the eventual consort of Hadrian. Historian's theorizing this include Päivi Setälä, Alison E. Cooley, Christian Settipani, Anthony R. Birley, Julian Bennett, Ronald Syme did not assume an exact relation to the imperial family but believed her to be a kinswoman of Trajan.

References

Sources

History of Horoscopic Astrology By James H. Holden
Rodgers, N., The History and Conquests of Ancient Rome, Hermes House, 2005.
Syme, Tacitus, 30–44; PIR Vlpivs 575

1st-century Roman women
Nerva–Antonine dynasty
Ulpii
Romans from Hispania
30s births
1st-century deaths